Dulacca is a rural town and locality in the Western Downs Region, Queensland, Australia.

Geography
The Warrego Highway traverses from east to west through the locality, passing through the town. The Western railway line also traverses from east to west immediately south and parallel to the highway with the town being served by Dulacca railway station.

Dulacca Creek flows through the locality from the town to the south, eventually being a tributary to the Balonne River.

History

The name Dulacca is believed to be derived from the Aboriginal word doolucah meaning emu nest.

Dulacca Post Office opened on 3 March 1879.

Dulacca State School opened on 1 March 1909.

The Dulacca Presbyterian Church opened in 1910, constructed from local cypress pine. After its closure the property passed into private hands. In 1977 the church building was donated and relocated to the Miles Historical Village on the condition was not used for church services. 

Rainville State School opened on 29 April 1912 but closed in 1917 due to low student numbers. It reopened in 1918 but closed again on 25 February 1921. On 6 April 1925 it reopened as Dulucca South State School but closed in 1930 before reopening again in 1933. It closed permanently on 30 December 1946.

Dulacca North State School opened on 28 January 1919, closing in 1936 due to low student numbers. It reopened in 1941 and closed permanently in 1953.

The Dulacca War Memorial was dedicated on 3 December 1921.

On 11 November 1951 the Roman Catholic Bishop of Toowoomba Joseph Basil Roper blessed and opened the Church of the Assumption of the Blessed Virgin Mary.

St James The Less Anglican church was dedicated on 24 May 1958 by the Right Revd. David Hand, Assistant Bishop of the Diocese of New Guinea. It was at 5 Temple Street. Its closure on 29 August 2015 was approved by Bishop Cameron Venables. It was sold into private ownership for $27,500  in April 2018.

At the  Dulacca had a population of 249.

Education 
Dulacca State School is a government primary (Prep-6) school for boys and girls on the north-east corner of North Road and Glynn Avenue. In 2016, the school had an enrolment of 24 students with 3 teachers (2 full-time equivalent) and 5 non-teaching staff (2 full-time equivalent). In 2018, the school had an enrolment of 23 students with 4 teachers (2 full-time equivalent) and 4 non-teaching staff (2 full-time equivalent).

There is no secondary school in Dulacca. The nearest secondary school is Miles State High School in Miles to the east.

Facilities
Dulacca Police Station is at 15 Glynn Avenue at the corner with Killarney Street.

Dulacca Fire Station is at 28 Glynn Avenue immediately adjacent to the Dulacca SES Facility.

Amenities 

Dulacca Country Golf Club is a 9-hole golf course at 89 Dulacca Golf Club Road.

Dulacca Pioneers Memorial Hall is at 36 Glynn Avenue. It is operated by the Dulacca Pioneers Memorial Hall And Progress Association. The Dulacca Post Office operates within the hall. The Dulacca War Memorial (a digger statue) is in its grounds.

The Catholic Church of the Assumption is at 39 Bell Street (on the north-west corner with Jubilee Avenue).

The Dulacca Presbyterian Church is at 4 Temple Street.

References

External links 

 

Towns in Queensland
Western Downs Region
Localities in Queensland